The Superior Sex was a Canadian game show television series which aired on CBC Television in 1961.

Premise
Elwy Yost moderated this game show in which a team of men competed against a team of women in skills such as golf putting, darts and quiz questions. Corinne Conley, Susan Fletcher, Royce Frith and Paul Kligman also appeared regularly.

Scheduling
This half-hour series was broadcast on Wednesdays at 10:00 p.m. from 5 July to 20 September 1961.

References

External links
 
 

CBC Television original programming
1961 Canadian television series debuts
1961 Canadian television series endings
1960s Canadian game shows